This is a list of albums that reached number-one on the Irish Independent Albums Chart in 2018. The charts were compiled by Irish Recorded Music Association (IRMA).

Chart history

See also
List of number-one albums of 2018 (Ireland)
List of number-one singles of 2018 (Ireland)

References

2018 in Irish music
Ireland Independent Albums
Independent 2018